Fossacesia is a city in the province of Chieti in the Abruzzo region of Italy.

Architecture

A historic attraction in the town is the Abbey of San Giovanni in Venere.

The town is also home to the Romanesque Period Church of San Silvestro, dating to the 11th century.

References

 
Coastal towns in Abruzzo